Plympton Erle, also spelt Plympton Earle, was a parliamentary borough in Devon. It elected two Members of Parliament (MPs) to the House of Commons from 1295 until 1832, when the borough was abolished by the Great Reform Act.

Members of Parliament

1295–1640

1640–1832

Elections
Elections in Plympton Erle were normally uncontested. The only contest between the Union of England and Scotland in 1707 and the abolition of the borough in 1832 was at the general election of 1802.

Notes

References 
Robert Beatson, A Chronological Register of Both Houses of Parliament (London: Longman, Hurst, Res & Orme, 1807) 
D Brunton & D H Pennington, Members of the Long Parliament (London: George Allen & Unwin, 1954)
Cobbett's Parliamentary history of England, from the Norman Conquest in 1066 to the year 1803 (London: Thomas Hansard, 1808) 
 Maija Jansson (ed.), Proceedings in Parliament, 1614 (House of Commons) (Philadelphia: American Philosophical Society, 1988)
 J Holladay Philbin, Parliamentary Representation 1832 – England and Wales (New Haven: Yale University Press, 1965)
Henry Stooks Smith, "The Parliaments of England from 1715 to 1847" (2nd edition, edited by FWS Craig – Chichester: Parliamentary Reference Publications, 1973)

Parliamentary constituencies in Devon (historic)
Constituencies of the Parliament of the United Kingdom established in 1295
Constituencies of the Parliament of the United Kingdom disestablished in 1832
Rotten boroughs